The Tipperary Raceway is a short oval motorsport racing circuit in the Republic of Ireland, situated just outside the village of Rosegreen in County Tipperary. The raceway hosts a number of National Hot Rod Racing Championship rounds. Use of the raceway has intensified since its inception in 1981, from 5 hours a week up to 60 hours a week in 2007, sparking a legal action from nearby equine businesses.

References

External links
Official Homepage
Venue Info

Motorsport venues in the Republic of Ireland
1981 establishments in Ireland
Sports venues completed in 1981
Sports venues in County Tipperary